Sorting nexin-17 is a protein that in humans is encoded by the SNX17 gene.

Function 

This gene encodes a member of the sorting nexin family. Members of this family contain a phox (PX) domain, which is a phosphoinositide binding domain, and are involved in intracellular trafficking. This protein does not contain a coiled coil region, like some family members, but contains a B41 domain. This protein interacts with the cytoplasmic domain of P-selectin, and may function in the intracellular trafficking of P-selectin.

Interactions 

SNX17 has been shown to interact with Low density lipoprotein receptor-related protein 8

References

Further reading